Leccinum insigne, commonly known as the aspen bolete or the aspen scaber stalk, is a species of bolete fungus in the family Boletaceae. Described as new to science in 1966, it is found in North America, where its range extends from eastern Canada south to New Jersey and west to the northern Rocky Mountains. It is a good edible mushroom, but there have been documented cases of adverse reactions; these range from headaches to gastrointestinal distress, which may or may not be attributed to food sensitivities alone. The specific epithet insigne means "distinctive or outstanding".

The cap is orange-brown and semi-fibrillose. The tubes are white to yellowish, staining brownish. The stipe is white with dark scabers. The flesh is white, sometimes turning gray, and possibly bluish in the base.

See also
List of Leccinum species
List of North American boletes

References

Edible fungi
Fungi described in 1966
Fungi of North America
insigne
Taxa named by Alexander H. Smith